Gotenica (in older sources also Gotnica, Gottscheerish: Gənize or In dr Gənizn) is a settlement in the Municipality of Kočevje in southern Slovenia. The area is part of the traditional region of Lower Carniola and is now included in the Southeast Slovenia Statistical Region.

Geography
It is connected by road to Kočevska Reka to the south and Grčarice to the north.

Name
Gotenica was first attested in written sources in 1363 as Goteniz (and as Gotintz and Gotnickh in 1498, and Gattenitz in 1499). The name is believed to be related to the toponym Gotenc, both based on the personal name *Goten, in turn derived from *Gotъ. Other Slovenian toponyms presumably based on this name are Gotna vas (a suburb of Novo Mesto), Gotovlje, and Goče. Other theories suggests that the name is derived from the Slovene verb gatiti 'to accumulate, pile up', referring to a place where water accumulates during flooding, or from the Slovene noun kot 'closed valley, cirque'. It is unlikely that the name is connected with the Goths, as some have suggested.

History
Gotenica is among the oldest villages in the Kočevje area that was established by Slovenes. It may have been established between 1315 and 1332 under Count Meinhard of Ortenburg (1280–1332). Later Gotenica was also settled by Gottschee Germans. In 1574 it had 12 farms divided into 24 half-farms, corresponding to a population between 110 and 120. In 1770 there were 68 houses in the settlement. A school was established in Gotenica in 1854. Before the Second World War, Gotenica had 108 houses and a population of 359, including 13 ethnic Slovenes. The economy of the village was based on farming, forestry, transporting sawn lumber, and beekeeping. Gotenica had a steam-powered sawmill, an inn, and a store. The German residents of Gotenica were evicted in December 1941. After the Second World War, in 1948 the village had a population of 138. In 1949 it was selected for the construction of an underground bunker system for Slovenia's military and political leaders. It was made part of a military exclusion zone and the remaining population was evicted. The village was sealed off until 1990 and it had no permanent residents during this time.

Religious heritage
Gotenica had two churches, a chapel, and a cemetery, all registered as cultural heritage today, that were destroyed by Slovenia's communist government after the Second World War.
The village church, dedicated to Saint Oswald, was mentioned in documents dating from 1363. It was one of the oldest churches in the Kočevje area. Around 1500 a walled enclosure was built around the church to protect locals from Ottoman raids. In 1839 the church was expanded. It was originally a chapel of ease belonging to the Parish of Kočevska Reka, but became a parish church in 1878 with the establishment of the Parish of Gotenica. The church had three altars; the side altars had paintings by  dating to 1863, and the church also had a Gothic monstrance dating to 1571. The church was destroyed in the 1950s.
A second church in the settlement was a pilgrimage church dedicated to Saint Leonard. It was built in 1652. It was a Romanesque structure with a rectangular nave and an polygonal chancel walled on three sides. The chancel had a barrel-vaulted roof, and the interior furnishings dated from the 17th to 19th centuries. The church was destroyed around 1950.
A chapel in Gotenica was dedicated to Saint Margaret. It dated from the second half of the eighteenth century and was remodeled in 1893, when a nave was added to the building. The chapel was destroyed soon after 1947.
The village cemetery, primarily containing Gottschee German graves, was located on the southern edge of the settlement. It was established in 1824, and the last burial took place in 1949. After this the cemetery was destroyed.

References

External links

Gotenica on Geopedia
Pre–World War II map of Gotenica with list of oeconyms and family names

Populated places in the Municipality of Kočevje